Gregory Jacobs (born August 14, 1968) is an American film director, assistant director, producer, and screenwriter. He has frequently collaborated with several film directors, most notably Steven Soderbergh, as well as directing himself, having overseen projects such as Criminal (2004), Wind Chill (2007) and Magic Mike XXL (2015).

Early life
Jacobs was born and raised in Harrington Park, New Jersey, where he attended Harrington Park Elementary School and was first introduced to film making by 7th grade teacher, Eugene Kennedy. He was further educated at Northern Valley Regional High School, Old Tappan. Jacobs is the son of Rafael Jacobs, who works as a lawyer, and Marti Jacobs. He has a brother, Douglas Jacobs, who is the president of Integrated Sports Media, a sports firm, located in Hoboken. Jacobs is also a graduate of the Tisch School of the Arts. During a hiatus from the school in 1986, he worked as an assistant director to John Sayles on the independent film Matewan.

Career
Jacobs has been active as an assistant director in his career for film directors such as the Coen brothers, Richard Linklater, Sayles, John Schlesinger and Steven Soderbergh. Jacobs first began cooperating with Soderbergh in 1993 on King of the Hill. In 2004, Jacobs released Criminal, his first feature film as a director, which he also wrote the script and helped produce. His second project was Wind Chill, announced in October 2005. It premiered in 2007. In March 2014, it was reported that Jacobs would helm Magic Mike XXL, the sequel to the first film, with Soderbergh acting instead as an executive producer, cinematographer and film editor.

Awards
For his involvement as one of the producers of Behind the Candelabra, Jacobs won an Emmy Award in the category Outstanding Miniseries or Movie, which he shared along with Jerry Weintraub, Susan Ekins and Michael Polaire. The same year, he was also the recipient of the Directors Guild of America Award for Outstanding Directorial Achievement in Movies for Television and Mini-Series, as well as the PGA Award, Outstanding Producer of Long-Form Television.

Filmography

References

External links

Living people
Northern Valley Regional High School at Old Tappan alumni
People from Harrington Park, New Jersey
Tisch School of the Arts alumni
American film directors
American film producers
American screenwriters
Primetime Emmy Award winners
1957 births